St. Peter or Saint Peter is a village in Fayette County, Illinois, United States. The population was 359 at the 2010 census.

Geography
St. Peter is located in southeastern Fayette County. Illinois Route 185 passes through the village, leading northwest  to Vandalia, the county seat, and southeast  to Farina.

Demographics

As of the census of 2000, there were 386 people, 156 households, and 111 families residing in the village. The racial makeup of the village was 98.96% White, 0.26% Asian, and 0.78% from two or more races.

There were 156 households, out of which 33.3% had children under the age of 18 living with them, 57.7% were married couples living together, 7.7% had a female householder with no husband present, and 28.8% were non-families. 26.9% of all households were made up of individuals, and 18.6% had someone living alone who was 65 years of age or older.  The average household size was 2.47 and the average family size was 2.98.

In the village, the population was spread out, with 25.4% under the age of 18, 8.5% from 18 to 24, 26.7% from 25 to 44, 17.9% from 45 to 64, and 21.5% who were 65 years of age or older.  The median age was 39 years. For every 100 females, there were 94.9 males.  For every 100 females age 18 and over, there were 92.0 males.

The median income for a household in the village was $31,406, and the median income for a family was $42,321. Males had a median income of $30,703 versus $20,625 for females. The per capita income for the village was $15,192.  About 6.7% of families and 12.7% of the population were below the poverty line, including 19.2% of those under age 18 and 16.7% of those age 65 or over.

References

Villages in Fayette County, Illinois
Villages in Illinois